The Bezirk Leipzig was a district (Bezirk) of East Germany that would last from 1952 to 1990. Leipzig would be reabsorbed into Saxony after the reunification of Germany. The administrative seat and the main town was Leipzig.

History
The district was established, with the other 13, on 25 July 1952, substituting the old German states. After 3 October 1990 it was disestablished following German reunification, becoming again part of the state of Saxony except kreise of Altenburg and Schmölln, became part of Thuringia.

Geography

Position
The Bezirk Leipzig, correspondent to the area of the actual Direktionsbezirk Leipzig, bordered with the Bezirke of Halle, Cottbus, Dresden, Karl-Marx-Stadt and Gera.

Subdivision
The Bezirk was divided into 13 Kreise: 1 urban district (Stadtkreis) and 12 rural districts (Landkreise): 
Urban district : Leipzig.
Rural districts : Altenburg; Borna; Delitzsch; Döbeln; Eilenburg; Geithain; Grimma; Leipzig-Land; Oschatz; Schmölln; Torgau; Wurzen.

See also
Direktionsbezirk Leipzig
Administrative divisions of East Germany
Bezirk Dresden
Bezirk Karl-Marx-Stadt

References

External links

Leipzig
Bezirk Leipzig
Former states and territories of Saxony
History of Leipzig